North Cornwall was a non-metropolitan district in Cornwall, England. It was abolished on 1 April 2009 and replaced by Cornwall Council.

Political control
The first election to the council was held in 1973, initially operating as a shadow authority before coming into its powers on 1 April 1974. Political control of the council from 1973 until the council's abolition in 2009 was held by the following parties:

Council elections
1973 North Cornwall District Council election
1976 North Cornwall District Council election
1979 North Cornwall District Council election (New ward boundaries & district boundary changes also took place)
1983 North Cornwall District Council election
1987 North Cornwall District Council election
1991 North Cornwall District Council election
1995 North Cornwall District Council election
1999 North Cornwall District Council election
2003 North Cornwall District Council election (New ward boundaries)
2007 North Cornwall District Council election

By-election results

References

External links
North Cornwall Council

Council elections in Cornwall
District council elections in England